Mary Louise Preis (born October 10, 1941) is an American politician who represented district 34 in the Maryland House of Delegates. She was first elected in 1990 and served until 1999.

Early life and education
Delegate Preis was born in Jacksonville, Illinois.  Preis graduated from Fontbonne College with her associate degree in 1963 (cum laude), (Woodrow Wilson Fellow).  She received her Master of Science degree (with distinction) in 1967 from Georgetown University's Edmund A. Walsh School of Foreign Service.  Finally she graduated from the University of Maryland School of Law in 1983 with her J.D. (cum laude). She was admitted to Maryland Bar, in 1983.

Career
While a member of the Maryland House of Delegates Mary Louis Preis was a member of the Judiciary Committee from 1991 until 1997, serving as chair of the gaming, law, & regulation subcommittee.  She was also on the Appropriations Committee from 1997 until 1999, the House Facilities Committee from 1993 until 1999.  She was House Vice-Chair of the Joint Committee on Administrative, Executive and Legislative Review from 1995 until 1999. Finally, she was a member of the Law and Justice Committee for the National Conference of State Legislatures from 1996 until 1999. She is a former chair of the Harford County Delegation.

Prior to serving in the Maryland General Assembly, Delegate Preis was a practicing attorney.  She was also a member of the Board of Trustees at Harford Community College from 1978 until 1988. She also was an Assistant Attorney General from 1985 until 1990, when she first got elected.

Delegate Preis has won several awards in her career including Outstanding Service Award from the Maryland Bar Association in 1995 and  the Distinguished Service Award from the Route 40 Business Association in 1998. In 1998, 2000, and 2002, she was named in one of Maryland's Top 100 Women by the Daily Record in their Circle of Excellence.

After serving as a State Delegate, Preis was appointed as Commissioner of the Office of Financial Regulation for the State of Maryland.  After she left this position, she worked for Citigroup.  Preis has endorsed Hillary Clinton for President.

Election results
1994 Race for Maryland House of Delegates – District 34
Voters choose three:
{| class="wikitable"
|-
!Name
!Votes
!Percent
!Outcome
|-
|-
|Nancy Jacobs, Rep.
|18,091
|  20%
|   Won
|-
|-
|Rose Mary Hatem Bonsack, Dem.
|17,762
|  20%
|   Won
|-
|-
|Mary Louise Preis, Dem.
|17,380
|  19%
|   Won
|-
|-
|B. Daniel Riley, Dem.
|13,891
|  15%
|   Lost
|-
|-
|Scott Williams, Rep.
|12,362
|  14%
|   Lost
|-
|-
|Kenneth A. Thompson, Rep.
|10,576
|  12%
|   Lost
|}

1990 Race for Maryland House of Delegates – District 34 - Harford County
Voters to choose three:
{| class="wikitable"
!Name
!Votes
!Percent
!Outcome
|-
|-
|Rose Mary Hatem Bonsack, Dem.
|13,373
|  19%
|   Won
|-
|-
|Mary Louise Preis, Dem.
|13,045
|  19%
|   Won
|-
|-
|David R. Craig, Rep.
|12,031
|  18%
|   Won
|-
|-
|William H. Cox Jr., Dem.
|10,296
|  15%
|   Lost
|-
|-
|David M. Meadows, Rep.
|10,069
|  15%
|   Lost
|-
|-
|Cecil W. Wood, Rep.
|9,840
|  14%
|   Lost
|}

References

External links
 Maryland House of Delegates: Mary Louise Preis

1941 births
Walsh School of Foreign Service alumni
Fontbonne University alumni
Living people
Democratic Party members of the Maryland House of Delegates
People from Harford County, Maryland
Politicians from Jacksonville, Illinois
University of Maryland Francis King Carey School of Law alumni
Women state legislators in Maryland
20th-century American politicians
20th-century American women politicians